The Fründenhorn is a mountain of the Bernese Alps, overlooking Lake Oeschinen in the Bernese Oberland.

References

External links

Fründenhorn on Hikr

Mountains of the Alps
Alpine three-thousanders
Mountains of Switzerland
Mountains of the canton of Bern